Kay Burley (previously Kay Burley @ Breakfast and sometimes known as Sky News Breakfast) is a British breakfast television programme that airs Monday to Friday from 7-10 am on Sky News. The show launched on Monday, 14 October 2019 as part of a replacement for long-running breakfast show Sunrise, which also includes The Early Rundown. 

The show is presented from Sky's Westminster studios at Four Millbank.

As the name suggests, Kay Burley is the primary and solo host for the programme. However as of 2022, Kay no longer hosts the show on Fridays. Friday editions use the same format and are hosted by Anna Jones, who also hosts the weekend breakfast slot on the channel.  Generally on Friday’s the show uses the Sky News Breakfast branding. The Monday to Friday programme however differs from its weekend counterpart by having a politics-focused, hard-news agenda, a large input on social media and is broadcast from different studios.

History 
Sky News announced on 23 September 2019 that they were introducing a new breakfast show to replace Sunrise, called Kay Burley @ Breakfast.

The show initially ran Monday to Thursday only and from 7-9 am live from Sky News's Westminster studios at Four Millbank, and unlike Sunrise, was hosted solely by Burley, with no separate news or sports anchors.

The show first aired on 14 October 2019, with Burley presenting from Abingdon Green in Westminster, with the weather being presented from Studio 21 at Osterley by Kirsty McCabe.

In September 2020, the show was renamed Kay Burley, being presented by Burley from Monday to Friday from a revamped Westminster set. The show now runs from 7-10 am on weekdays.

On 10 December 2020, Burley stepped back from presenting the show for six months, as a result of breaching London's tier 2 coronavirus restrictions. The Kay Burley breakfast show format remains in place but was branded as Sky News Breakfast on programme guides. However the show continued to be broadcast from Sky News's Westminster studios and retained the same format and running order.

Niall Paterson hosted the programme Monday to Thursday from December 2020 until March 2021, with Stephen Dixon covering Paterson's role on The Early Rundown. The pair switched duties as of April 2021 with Dixon hosting in Burley's absence.

As of June 2021, the Kay Burley branding reappeared following Burley's return to the channel.

From early January 2021 until June 2021, Gillian Joseph regularly hosted the programme on Fridays.

On-Air Team

Current presenters

References

2019 British television series debuts
2020s British television series
Sky News
Sky television news shows
Sky UK original programming
English-language television shows